Nikolsky is a rural locality (a settlement) in Ufa, Bashkortostan, Russia. The population was 198 as of 2010. There is 1 street.

Geography 
Nikolsky is located 253 km southeast of Ufa.

References 

Rural localities in Ufa urban okrug